Ömercan İlyasoğlu (born January 1, 2001) is a Turkish professional basketball player who plays as a point guard for Beşiktaş Emlakjet of the Turkish Basketbol Süper Ligi (BSL) on a loan from Anadolu Efes.

References

External links
Ömercan İlyasoğlu Euroleague.net Profile
Ömercan İlyasoğlu TBLStat.net Profile
Ömercan İlyasoğlu Eurobasket Profile
Ömercan İlyasoğlu TBL Profile

Living people
2001 births
Anadolu Efes S.K. players
Basketball players from Istanbul
Beşiktaş men's basketball players
Bursaspor Basketbol players
Point guards
Turkish men's basketball players